The Ukraine national under-17 football team represents Ukraine in international football at this age level and is controlled by the Football Federation of Ukraine, the governing body for football in Ukraine.

UEFA European Under-16/Under-17 Football Championship record

Under-16 format

Under-17 format
{| class="wikitable" style="text-align: center;"
!colspan=2 width="200"|Finals record
!rowspan=2|
!colspan=8|Qualification record
|-
!Year
!Result
!width=20|
!width=20|Pld
!width=20|W
!width=20|D*
!width=20|L
!width=20|GF
!width=20|GA
!width=25|GD
|-
| 2002||Group stage|| ||1||2||2||0||0||6||3||+3
|-
| 2003||rowspan="1"|Did not qualify|| ||4||3||0||2||1||7||8||-1
|-
| 2004||Group stage|| ||1||6||5||0||1||17||5||+12
|- 
| 2005||Elite Round|| ||2||6||3||3||0||12||1||+11
|-
| 2006||rowspan="1"|Did not qualify|| ||3||3||1||1||1||4||4||0
|-
| 2007||Group stage|| ||1||6||6||0||0||20||3||+17
|-
| 2008||rowspan="2"|Did not qualify|| ||4||3||0||1||2||2||6||-4
|-   
| 2009|| ||3||3||1||1||1||2||5||-3
|-   
| 2010||rowspan="3"|Elite Round|| ||4||6||1||3||2||5||7||-2
|-
| 2011|| ||4||6||1||3||2||4||6||-2
|-
| 2012|| ||4||6||1||2||3||4||5||-1
|-
| 2013||Group stage|| ||4||6||4||2||0||15||2||+13
|-
| 2014||rowspan="2"|Elite Round|| ||2||6||2||2||2||9||7||+2
|-
| 2015|| ||4||6||0||3||3||1||6||-5
|-
| 2016||rowspan="2"|Group stage|| ||1||6||4||2||0||13||2||+11
|-
| 2017|| ||2||6||2||2||2||8||9||-1
|-
| 2018||Did not qualify|| ||3||6||2||2||2||11||8||-3
|-
| 2019||rowspan="1"|Did not qualify|| ||3||6||3||1||2||18||6||+12
|-
| 2020||rowspan=2 colspan=10|Cancelled due to COVID-19 pandemic|-
| 2021
|- 
| 2022 ||rowspan="1"|Did not qualify|| ||3||6||3||1||2||12||11||+1
|- 
| 2023||rowspan=2 colspan=10|to be determined|- 
| 2024
|-
|Total
|6/19
|
|Best: 1
|98
|41
|31
|26
|170
|104
|+60
|}*Denotes draws include knockout matches decided on penalty kicks.''

Head coaches
 2010-2011 Yuriy Moroz
 2013-2014 Oleh Kuznetsov
 2016-2017 Serhiy Popov
 2017-2018 Oleh Kuznetsov
 2018- Volodymyr Yezerskiy

Tournaments
 FIFA U-17 World Cup
 UEFA European Under-17 Championship

Achievements

UEFA European Under-17 Championship
 U-16 European Championship in 1994 – 3rd place

Results and fixtures

2022

2023

Current squad
 The following players were called up for the 2023 UEFA European Under-17 Championship qualification elit round matches.
 Match dates: 7—13 March 2023
 Opposition: ,  and Caps and goals correct as of:''' 13 March 2023, after the match against

Recent call-ups
The following players have been called up for the team within the last 12 months.

See also 
 Ukraine (Senior) team
 Ukraine Under-21 team
 Ukraine Under-19 team
 FIFA U-17 World Cup
 UEFA European Under-17 Championship

References

External links
 Uefa Under-17 website Contains full results archive

European national under-17 association football teams
under-17
Youth football in Ukraine